Ta is the sixteenth consonant of Indic abugidas. In modern Indic scripts, ta is derived from the early "Ashoka" Brahmi letter  after having gone through the Gupta letter .

Āryabhaṭṭa numeration
Aryabhata used Devanagari letters for numbers, very similar to the Greek numerals, even after the invention of Indian numerals. The values of the different forms of त are: 
त  = 16 (१६)
ति  = 1,600 (१ ६००)
तु  = 160,000 (१ ६० ०००)
तृ  = 16,000,000 (१ ६० ०० ०००)
तॢ  = 1,600,000,000 (१ ६० ०० ०० ०००)
ते  = 16 (१६×१०१०)
तै  = 16 (१६×१०१२)
तो  = 16 (१६×१०१४
तौ  = 16 (१६×१०१६)

Historic Ta
There are three different general early historic scripts - Brahmi and its variants, Kharoṣṭhī, and Tocharian, the so-called slanting Brahmi. Ta as found in standard Brahmi,  was a simple geometric shape, with variations toward more flowing forms by the Gupta . The Tocharian Ta  had an alternate Fremdzeichen form, . The third form of ta, in Kharoshthi was probably derived from Aramaic separately from the Brahmi letter.

Brahmi Ta
The Brahmi letter , Ta, is probably derived from the Aramaic Taw , and is thus related to the modern Latin T and Greek Tau. Several identifiable styles of writing the Brahmi Ta can be found, most associated with a specific set of inscriptions from an artifact or diverse records from an historic period. As the earliest and most geometric style of Brahmi, the letters found on the Edicts of Ashoka and other records from around that time are normally the reference form for Brahmi letters, with vowel marks not attested until later forms of Brahmi back-formed to match the geometric writing style.

Tocharian Ta
The Tocharian letter  is derived from the Brahmi , and has an alternate Fremdzeichen form  used in conjuncts and as an alternate representation of Tä.

Kharoṣṭhī Ta
The Kharoṣṭhī letter  is generally accepted as being derived from the Aramaic Taw , and is thus related to T and Tau, in addition to the Brahmi Ta.

Devanagari Ta

Ta (त) is a consonant of the Devanagari abugida. It ultimately arose from the Brahmi letter , after having gone through the Gupta letter . Letters that derive from it are the Gujarati letter ત, and the Modi letter 𑘝.

Devanagari-using Languages
Like all Indic scripts, Devanagari uses vowel marks attached to the base consonant to override the inherent /ə/ vowel:

Conjuncts with त

Devanagari exhibits conjunct ligatures, as is common in Indic scripts. In modern Devanagari texts, most conjuncts are formed by reducing the letter shape to fit tightly to the following letter, usually by dropping a character's vertical stem, sometimes referred to as a "half form". Some conjunct clusters are always represented by a true ligature, instead of a shape that can be broken into constituent independent letters. Vertically stacked conjuncts are ubiquitous in older texts, while only a few are still used routinely in modern Devanagari texts. The use of ligatures and vertical conjuncts may vary across languages using the Devanagari script, with Marathi in particular preferring the use of half forms where texts in other languages would show ligatures and vertical stacks.

Ligature conjuncts of त
True ligatures are quite rare in Indic scripts. The most common ligated conjuncts in Devanagari are in the form of a slight mutation to fit in context or as a consistent variant form appended to the adjacent characters. Those variants include Na and the Repha and Rakar forms of Ra. Nepali and Marathi texts use the "eyelash" Ra half form  for an initial "R" instead of repha.
 Repha र্ (r) + त (ta) gives the ligature rta: 

 Eyelash र্ (r) + त (ta) gives the ligature rta:

 त্ (t) + rakar र (ra) gives the ligature tra:

 Repha र্ (r) + त্ (t) + rakar र (ra) gives the ligature rtra:

 त্ (t) + र্ (r) + य (ya) gives the ligature trya:

 क্ (k) + त (ta) gives the ligature kta:

 क্ (k) + त্ (t) + rakar र (ra) gives the ligature ktra:

 क্ (k) + त্ (t) + व (va) gives the ligature ktva:

 ङ্ (ŋ) + क্ (k) + त (ta) gives the ligature ŋkta:

 त্ (t) + त (ta) gives the ligature tta:

 Repha र্ (r) + त্ (t) + त (ta) gives the ligature rtta:

 त্ (t) + त্ (t) + rakar र (ra) gives the ligature ttra:

 Repha र্ (r) + त্ (t) + त্ (t) + rakar र (ra) gives the ligature rttra:

 त্ (t) + त্ (t) + न (na) gives the ligature ttna:

 त্ (t) + त্ (t) + व (va) gives the ligature ttva:

 प্ (p) + त (ta) gives the ligature pta:

 प্ (p) + त্ (t) + rakar र (ra) gives the ligature ptra:

 ष্ (ṣ) + त (ta) gives the ligature ṣta:

Stacked conjuncts of त
Vertically stacked ligatures are the most common conjunct forms found in Devanagari text. Although the constituent characters may need to be stretched and moved slightly in order to stack neatly, stacked conjuncts can be broken down into recognizable base letters, or a letter and an otherwise standard ligature.
 छ্ (cʰ) + त (ta) gives the ligature cʰta:

 ढ্ (ḍʱ) + त (ta) gives the ligature ḍʱta:

 ड্ (ḍ) + त (ta) gives the ligature ḍta:

 द্ (d) + त (ta) gives the ligature dta:

 ङ্ (ŋ) + त (ta) gives the ligature ŋta:

 त্ (t) + ब (ba) gives the ligature tba:

 त্ (t) + च (ca) gives the ligature tca:

 त্ (t) + ज (ja) gives the ligature tja:

 त্ (t) + ज্ (j) + ञ (ña) gives the ligature tjña:

 त্ (t) + ल (la) gives the ligature tla:

 त্ (t) + ञ (ña) gives the ligature tña:

 ठ্ (ṭʰ) + त (ta) gives the ligature ṭʰta:

 ट্ (ṭ) + त (ta) gives the ligature ṭta:

 त্ (t) + न (na) gives the ligature tna:

 त্ (t) + व (va) gives the ligature tva:

Bengali Ta
The Bengali script ত is derived from the Siddhaṃ , and is marked by a similar horizontal head line, but less geometric shape, than its Devanagari counterpart, त. The inherent vowel of Bengali consonant letters is /ɔ/, so the bare letter ত will sometimes be transliterated as "to" instead of "ta". Adding okar, the "o" vowel mark, gives a reading of /t̪o/.
Like all Indic consonants, ত can be modified by marks to indicate another (or no) vowel than its inherent "a".

ত in Bengali-using languages
ত is used as a basic consonant character in all of the major Bengali script orthographies, including Bengali and Assamese.

Conjuncts with ত
Bengali ত exhibits conjunct ligatures, as is common in Indic scripts, with a tendency towards stacked ligatures.

Khanda Ta

Some ostensible conjuncts with an initial ত are realized visually with a character called Khanda Ta "Broken Ta". This "broken" form of ত is used to represent the bare consonant without an inherent "A" vowel, and does not normally take vowel marks. It resembles the normal letter ত, but reversed, without a head line, and a reduced tail.
 ৎ (khanda ta) + ক (ka) gives the conjunct tka:

Other ত Conjuncts
Other conjuncts take the form of a ligature when ত is the initial head consonant, or usually as a stacked conjunct when ত is non-head. As is normal, as a later element in a stacked conjunct, ত loses its head line when conjoining, and has a reduced tail when followed by Ra-phala.
 ক্ (k) + ত (ta) gives the ligature kta:

 ক্ (k) + ত্ (t) + র (ra) gives the ligature ktra, with the ra phala suffix:

 ন্ (n) + ত (ta) gives the ligature nta:

 ন্ (n) + ত্ (t) + র (ra) gives the ligature ntra, with the ra phala suffix:

 ন্ (n) + ত্ (t) + র্ (r) + য (ya) gives the ligature ntrya, with the ra phala and ya phala suffixes

 ন্ (n) + ত্ (t) + ব (va) gives the ligature ntva, with the va phala suffix:

 ন্ (n) + ত্ (t) + য (ya) gives the ligature ntya, with the ya phala suffix:

 প্ (p) + ত (ta) gives the ligature pta:

 র্ (r) + ত (ta) gives the ligature rta, with the repha prefix:

 র্ (r) + ত্ (t) + র (ra) gives the ligature rtra, with the repha prefix and ra phala suffix:

 র্ (r) + ত্ (t) + য (ya) gives the ligature rtya, with the repha prefix and ya phala suffix:

 স্ (s) + ত (ta) gives the ligature sta:

 স্ (s) + ত্ (t) + র (ra) gives the ligature stra, with the ra phala suffix:

 স্ (s) + ত্ (t) + ব (va) gives the ligature stva, with the va phala suffix:

 স্ (s) + ত্ (t) + য (ya) gives the ligature stya, with the ya phala suffix:

 ত্ (t) + ম (ma) gives the ligature tma:

 ত্ (t) + ম্ (m) + য (ya) gives the ligature tmya, with the ya phala suffix:

 ত্ (t) + ন (na) gives the ligature tna:

 ত্ (t) + র (ra) gives the ligature tra, with the ra phala suffix:

 ত্ (t) + র্ (r) + য (ya) gives the ligature trya, with the ra phala and ya phala suffixes

 ত্ (t) + স (sa) gives the ligature tsa:

 ত্ (t) + ত (ta) gives the ligature tta:

 ত্ (t) + থ (tʰa) gives the ligature ttʰa:

 ত্ (t) + ত্ (t) + ব (va) gives the ligature ttva, with the va phala suffix:

 ত্ (t) + ত্ (t) + য (ya) gives the ligature ttya, with the ya phala suffix:

 ত্ (t) + ব (va) gives the ligature tva, with the va phala suffix:

 ত্ (t) + য (ya) gives the ligature tya, with the ya phala suffix:

Gujarati Ta

Ta (ત) is the sixteenth consonant of the Gujarati abugida. It is derived from the Devanagari Ta  with the top bar (shiro rekha) removed, and ultimately the Brahmi letter .

Gujarati-using Languages
The Gujarati script is used to write the Gujarati and Kutchi languages. Like all Indic scripts, Gujarati uses vowel marks attached to the base consonant to override the inherent /ə/ vowel:

Conjuncts with ત

Gujarati ત exhibits conjunct ligatures, much like its parent Devanagari Script. Most Gujarati conjuncts can only be formed by reducing the letter shape to fit tightly to the following letter, usually by dropping a character's vertical stem, sometimes referred to as a "half form". A few conjunct clusters can be represented by a true ligature, instead of a shape that can be broken into constituent independent letters, and vertically stacked conjuncts can also be found in Gujarati, although much less commonly than in Devanagari.
True ligatures are quite rare in Indic scripts. The most common ligated conjuncts in Gujarati are in the form of a slight mutation to fit in context or as a consistent variant form appended to the adjacent characters. Those variants include Na and the Repha and Rakar forms of Ra.
 ર્ (r) + ત (ta) gives the ligature RTa:

 ત્ (t) + ર (ra) gives the ligature TRa:

 ત્ (t) + ત (ta) gives the ligature TTa:

 ત્ (t) + ન (na) gives the ligature TNa:

 પ્ (p) + ત (ta) gives the ligature PTa:

 ષ્ (ʂ) + ત (ta) gives the ligature ṢTa:

Javanese Ta

Telugu Ta

Ta (త) is a consonant of the Telugu abugida. It ultimately arose from the Brahmi letter . It is closely related to the Kannada letter ತ. Most Telugu consonants contain a v-shaped headstroke that is related to the horizontal headline found in other Indic scripts, although headstrokes do not connect adjacent letters in Telugu. The headstroke is normally lost when adding vowel matras.
Telugu conjuncts are created by reducing trailing letters to a subjoined form that appears below the initial consonant of the conjunct. Many subjoined forms are created by dropping their headline, with many extending the end of the stroke of the main letter body to form an extended tail reaching up to the right of the preceding consonant. This subjoining of trailing letters to create conjuncts is in contrast to the leading half forms of Devanagari and Bengali letters. Ligature conjuncts are not a feature in Telugu, with the only non-standard construction being an alternate subjoined form of Ṣa (borrowed from Kannada) in the KṢa conjunct.

Malayalam Ta

Ta (ത) is a consonant of the Malayalam abugida. It ultimately arose from the Brahmi letter , via the Grantha letter  Ta. Like in other Indic scripts, Malayalam consonants have the inherent vowel "a", and take one of several modifying vowel signs to represent syllables with another vowel or no vowel at all.

Conjuncts of ത
As is common in Indic scripts, Malayalam joins letters together to form conjunct consonant clusters. There are several ways in which conjuncts are formed in Malayalam texts: using a post-base form of a trailing consonant placed under the initial consonant of a conjunct, a combined ligature of two or more consonants joined together, a conjoining form that appears as a combining mark on the rest of the conjunct, the use of an explicit candrakkala mark to suppress the inherent "a" vowel, or a special consonant form called a "chillu" letter, representing a bare consonant without the inherent "a" vowel. Texts written with the modern reformed Malayalam orthography, put̪iya lipi, may favor more regular conjunct forms than older texts in paḻaya lipi, due to changes undertaken in the 1970s by the Government of Kerala.
 ക് (k) + ത (ta) gives the ligature kta:

 ത് (t) + ത (ta) gives the ligature tta:

 ന് (n) + ത (ta) gives the ligature nta:

 പ് (p) + ത (ta) gives the ligature pta:

 യ് (y) + ത (ta) gives the ligature yta:

 സ് (s) + ത (ta) gives the ligature sta:

 ത് (t) + ഥ (tʰa) gives the ligature ttʰa:

 ത് (t) + ന (na) gives the ligature tna:

 ത് (t) + ഭ (bʰa) gives the ligature tbʰa:

 ത് (t) + മ (ma) gives the ligature tma:

 ത് (t) + സ (sa) gives the ligature tsa:

Odia Ta

Ta (ତ) is a consonant of the Odia abugida. It ultimately arose from the Brahmi letter , via the Siddhaṃ letter  Ta. Like in other Indic scripts, Odia consonants have the inherent vowel "a", and take one of several modifying vowel signs to represent syllables with another vowel or no vowel at all.

Conjuncts of ତ 
As is common in Indic scripts, Odia joins letters together to form conjunct consonant clusters. The most common conjunct formation is achieved by using a small subjoined form of trailing consonants. Most consonants' subjoined forms are identical to the full form, just reduced in size, although a few drop the curved headline or have a subjoined form not directly related to the full form of the consonant. The second type of conjunct formation is through pure ligatures, where the constituent consonants are written together in a single graphic form. This ligature may be recognizable as being a combination of two characters or it can have a conjunct ligature unrelated to its constituent characters.
 ତ୍ (t) + କ (ka) gives the ligature tka:

 ତ୍ (t) + ତ (ta) gives the ligature tta:

 ତ୍ (t) + ସ (sa) gives the ligature tsa:

Comparison of Ta
The various Indic scripts are generally related to each other through adaptation and borrowing, and as such the glyphs for cognate letters, including Ta, are related as well.

Character encodings of Ta
Most Indic scripts are encoded in the Unicode Standard, and as such the letter Ta in those scripts can be represented in plain text with unique codepoint. Ta from several modern-use scripts can also be found in legacy encodings, such as ISCII.

References

 Conjuncts are identified by IAST transliteration, except aspirated consonants are indicated with a superscript "h" to distinguish from an unaspirated cononant + Ha, and the use of the IPA "ŋ" and "ʃ" instead of the less dinstinctive "ṅ" and "ś".

Indic letters